The 1905 SAFA Grand Final was an Australian rules football competition. North Adelaide beat Port Adelaide by 44 to 12.

Teams

References 

SANFL Grand Finals
SAFA Grand Final, 1905